Saint James Southern is a parliamentary constituency represented in the House of Representatives of the Jamaican Parliament. It elects one Member of Parliament by the first past the post system of election. The constituency was first contested in the 1976 general election. The current MP is Homer Davis of the Jamaica Labour Party who has been in office since 2020.

Boundaries 

The constituency covers the Cambridge, Catadupa, Maroon Town, and Welcome Hall electoral divisions in St. James.

Members of Parliament

Elections

Elections from 2000 to Present

See also
 Politics of Jamaica
 Elections in Jamaica

References

Parliamentary constituencies of Jamaica